Cascine is a historic plantation complex and national historic district located near Louisburg, Franklin County, North Carolina.   The district encompasses 12 contributing buildings, 4 contributing sites, and 3 contributing structures. The main house was built about 1850, and is a large two-story, Greek Revival style frame dwelling, in the manner of Jacob W. Holt, with Gothic Revival style influences.  Also on the property is a small, one-story frame dwelling dated to about 1752.  It was repaired and refurbished in the mid-20th century.  Also on the property are the contributing brick kitchen, frame stable, granary, carriage house, family cemetery, slave cemetery, remains of slave quarters, tenant house, six log and frame tobacco barns, grist mill complex, and archaeological sites.

It was listed on the National Register of Historic Places in 1972, with a boundary increase in 1985.

References

External links

Plantation houses in North Carolina
Historic American Buildings Survey in North Carolina
Farms on the National Register of Historic Places in North Carolina
Historic districts on the National Register of Historic Places in North Carolina
Houses completed in 1752
Greek Revival houses in North Carolina
Gothic Revival architecture in North Carolina
Houses in Franklin County, North Carolina
National Register of Historic Places in Franklin County, North Carolina
Slave cabins and quarters in the United States